Mukti Bandhan (English: Bond Redemption) is a television series from India, that has aired on Colors, based on the story of an ordinary man with an extraordinary sense for business. The story is an adaptation of Harkisan Mehta's novel Mukti Bandhan. The story was adapted by Vipul Mehta. Due to a high-class concept, this show could not get success with ratings, so it was shifted to 11 pm.

Cast

Awards and nominations

External links

Colors TV original programming
Indian drama television series
2011 Indian television series debuts
2011 Indian television series endings